Saint Amantius of Como (died April 8, 448 AD) is venerated as the third bishop of Como.  He was preceded by Felix of Como and Saint Provinus.  He was succeeded by Saint Abundius.  His feast day is 8 April.

Biography
A late legend, based on a naive reading of the toponym Cantium, says he was born in Canterbury, and served as an imperial dignitary before becoming a bishop. The legend continues he was a relative of Theodosius II through his mother. He is credited with building the original Basilica of Sant'Abbondio outside of the city walls of Como.  The basilica was built to house several relics associated with Saint Peter and Saint Paul, which Amantius had brought from Rome.

Veneration
His relics were preserved at Sant'Abbondio until July 2, 1590, when they were transferred to the Chiesa del Gesù in Como.  The relics were later transferred to the church of San Fedele in Como, where they remain today.

Bibliography

 Siro Borrani, Il Ticino Sacro. Memorie religiose della Svizzera Italiana raccolte dal sacerdote Siro Borrani prevosto di Losone, Lugani, Tip. e Libreria Cattolica di Giovanni Grassi, 1896.
 Adriano Caprioli, Antonio Rimoldi, Luciano Vaccaro, Diocesi di Como, Brescia, Editrice La Scuola, 1986, .

Notes

External links
Sant' Amanzio di Como 
Saints.SQPN: Amantius of Como
Catholic Online: Amantius of Como

People from Como
Saints from Roman Italy
Italian saints
Italian Roman Catholic saints
Year of birth unknown
448 deaths
Bishops of Como
5th-century Italian bishops
5th-century Christian saints
5th-century Romans